Isaac Hutchinson (born 10 April 2000) is an English professional footballer who plays as a midfielder for Walsall.

Early and personal life
Born in Eastbourne, Hutchinson attended Cavendish School.

Career

Southend United
Hutchinson began his career with Ratton Rangers. After eight years with Brighton & Hove Albion, Hutchinson joined Southend United in the summer of 2018 following a trial, turning down a move to Sparta Prague in the process. He made his senior debut on 4 September 2018 in the EFL Trophy, scoring a goal. He made his Football League debut on 15 December 2018.

Derby County
Hutchinson signed a two-year deal with Derby County on 2 October 2020, joining the club's under-23 side. He made his senior debut for the club in an FA Cup defeat to Chorley on 9 January 2021, before joining League Two side Forest Green Rovers on loan for the remainder of the 2020–21 season two days later. He made 10 appearances on loan at Forest Green.

Hutchinson made his league debut for Derby as a substitute in a 1–1 draw with Huddersfield Town in the opening match of the 2021–22 season on 7 August 2021. He scored his first goal for the club in an EFL Cup tie against Salford City on 10 August 2021.

On 31 January 2022, Hutchinson joined League Two club Crawley Town on loan until the end of the season.

Walsall
In June 2022 it was announced that he would join Walsall on 1 July 2022.

Career statistics

References

2000 births
Living people
English footballers
Association football midfielders
Brighton & Hove Albion F.C. players
Southend United F.C. players
Derby County F.C. players
Forest Green Rovers F.C. players
Crawley Town F.C. players
Walsall F.C. players
English Football League players